Mark Lane (February 24, 1927 – May 10, 2016) was an American attorney, New York state legislator, civil rights activist, and Vietnam war-crimes investigator. Sometimes referred to as a gadfly, Lane is best known as a leading researcher, author, and conspiracy theorist on the assassination of United States President John F. Kennedy. From his 1966 number-one bestselling critique of the Warren Commission, Rush to Judgment, to Last Word: My Indictment of the CIA in the Murder of JFK, published in 2011, Lane wrote at least four major works on the JFK assassination and no fewer than ten books overall.

Early career
Mark Lane was born in The Bronx, New York, the son of Harry Arnold and Elizabeth Levin (Levin was changed to Lane in the 1920s), and raised in Brooklyn, New York. He served in United States Army after World War II from 1945 to 1946 and was stationed in Austria. After attending Long Island University, he received a Bachelor of Laws from Brooklyn Law School in 1951. As a law student, Lane was the administrative assistant to the National Lawyers Guild and orchestrated a fund-raising event at Town Hall in New York City that featured American folk singer Pete Seeger.

Following his admission to the New York bar in 1951, Lane established a practice with Seymour Ostrow in East Harlem. Although Lane acquired a reputation as "a defender of the poor and oppressed," Ostrow later asserted that Lane was "motivated more by his ambition and quest for publicity than any dedication to a cause or concern for the interest of his clients." The partnership dissolved in the late 1950s.

In 1959, Lane helped found the Reform Democrat movement within the New York Democratic Party. He was elected with the support of Eleanor Roosevelt and presidential candidate John F. Kennedy to the New York Legislature in 1960. During his own campaign, he also managed the New York City area's campaign for Kennedy's 1960 presidential bid. He was a member of the New York State Assembly (New York County's 10th District, encompassing East Harlem and Yorkville, where Lane resided) in 1961 and 1962. In the legislature, Lane spent considerable time working to abolish capital punishment. Lane promised to serve for only one term, and then manage the campaign for his replacement—which he did.

In June 1961, during the civil rights movement, Lane was the only sitting legislator to be arrested for opposing segregation as a Freedom Rider. In 1962, he ran for Congress in the Democratic primary and lost. In the 1968 presidential election, Lane appeared on the ballot as a third party vice-presidential candidate, running on the Freedom and Peace Party ticket (an offshoot of the Peace and Freedom Party) with Dick Gregory.

Kennedy assassination

Warren Commission
After the assassination of President John F. Kennedy, Lane wrote a letter to Chief Justice Earl Warren on December 17, 1963 requesting that the Warren Commission give consideration to appointing defense counsel to advocate for Lee Harvey Oswald's rights, and enclosed a 10,000 word "brief" that he had submitted for publication. Published less than four weeks after the assassination, Lane's article in the December 19 issue of National Guardian, "Oswald Innocent? A Lawyer’s Brief", attempted to rebut various assertions made by Dallas County District Attorney Henry Wade regarding the assassination and to offer a defense of Oswald. Oswald's mother, Marguerite Oswald, reached out to Lane after reading the article.

In December, Lane travelled to Dallas to question Oswald's family, and three days later suggested to Marguerite Oswald that she sue the city of Dallas for the death of her son. Lane said: "It would be an attempt to give Lee Oswald in death what he could not obtain life—a fair trial." Marguerite Oswald announced on January 14 that she had hired Lane to represent her son before the Warren Commission. After Lane notified the commission that he had been retained by Marguerite Oswald to represent her deceased son, the Commission's general counsel J. Lee Rankin replied: "The Commission does not believe that it would be useful or desirable to permit an attorney representing Lee Harvey Oswald to have access to the investigative materials within the possession of the Commission or to participate in any hearings to be conducted by the Commission." Although Warren reversed that position with a statement released on February 25 that said Walter E. Craig, president of the American Bar Association, had been appointed by the Commission to represent the interests of Oswald, Lane remarked that he still considered himself to be Oswald's counsel.

Lane testified before the Warren Commission on March 4, 1964 and again on July 2, 1964. In his March 4 testimony, Lane testified that he had contacted witness Helen Markham some time within the five days preceding his appearance before the Commission and that she had described Tippit's killer to him as "short, a little on the heavy side, and his hair was somewhat bushy". He added, "I think it is fair to state that an accurate description of Oswald would be average height, quite slender with thin and receding hair."

At the beginning of April, Marguerite Oswald asked Lane for a copy of his report, asked him to stop any organized effort on behalf of her son through his Citizens Committee of Inquiry, and terminated his representation.

During the July 2 hearing, exchanges between Lane and Warren were often heated. After Lane reiterated his request to appear before the Commission as Oswald's counsel, Warren reminded him that the Commission had already denied his request to act as counsel, explaining that Marina Oswald was Lee Harvey Oswald's legal representative and that she was already represented by counsel. In addressing the assertion that Markham's description of Tippit's killer was not consistent with the appearance of Oswald, the Warren Commission stated that they had reviewed the telephone transcript in which she was alleged to have made it. The Commission wrote: "A review of the complete transcript has satisfied the Commission that Mrs. Markham strongly reaffirmed her positive identification of Oswald and denied having described the killer as short, stocky and having bushy hair." As a result of this, Lane was called to reappear before the Warren Commission in July 1964. Warren told Lane that the commission had "every reason to doubt the truthfulness" of some of his testimony due to the appearance of his misrepresentation of what Markham told him.

Chief Justice Warren had only contempt for Lane. According to biographer Ed Cray, Warren deemed Lane "a publicity seeker who played fast and loose with the subject." Warren maintained prior to his death that the Commission had investigated all leads and left no witness unheard.

Lane's work on the assassination prompted Bertrand Russell to rally support for the formation of a Who Killed Kennedy Committee in Britain.

In 1975, Lane became the director of the Citizens Commission of Inquiry (CCI), which challenged the veracity of official accounts of the assassination.

Rush to Judgment
Lane's critique of the Warren Commission, Rush to Judgment, was published in 1966. The book became a number one best seller and spent 29 weeks on the New York Times best-seller list. It was adapted into a documentary film in 1967. Rush to Judgment criticizes in detail the work and conclusions of the Warren Commission. Lane questions, among other things, the Warren Commission conclusion that three shots were fired from the Texas School Book Depository and focuses on the witnesses who had recounted seeing or hearing shots coming from the grassy knoll in Dealey Plaza. Lane questions whether Oswald was guilty of the murder of policeman J.D. Tippit shortly after the Kennedy murder. Lane also states that none of the Warren Commission firearm experts were able to duplicate Oswald's shooting feat.

At a news conference a few months after the release of the book, Texas Governor John Connally described Lane as "journalistic scavanger". Lane responded that Connally had showed "an abysmal ignorance to the implications of his own testimony" and was seeking to "bring back the days of McCarthyism.

According to former KGB officer Vasili Mitrokhin in his 1999 book The Sword and the Shield, the KGB helped finance Lane's research on Rush to Judgment without the author's knowledge. The KGB  allegedly used journalist Genrikh Borovik as a contact and provided Lane with $2000 for research and travel in 1964. Lane called the allegation "an outright lie" and wrote, "Neither the KGB nor any person or organization associated with it ever made any contribution to my work."

Other books Lane wrote on the topic
Lane later wrote A Citizen's Dissent, documenting his response to the Warren Commission's findings on the Kennedy assassination. He also wrote the first screenplay of the 1973 film Executive Action (starring Burt Lancaster and Robert Ryan), with Donald Freed. Lane's associate, Steve Jaffe, was supervising producer and credited with supplying much of the research material for the film.  Lane asserted in his 1991 book Plausible Denial that he only worked on the first draft of the screenplay which was ultimately credited to Dalton Trumbo. He noted that he collaborated with Donald Freed on it and after seeing subsequent drafts, they complained both privately to the producer and publicly at press conferences, pointing out errors in the work.

In 1991, Lane described Plausible Denial as his "last word" on the subject and told Patricia Holt of the San Francisco Chronicle: "I'll never write another sentence about the (JFK) assassination". In November 2011, Lane published a third major book on the JFK assassination titled Last Word: My Indictment of the CIA in the Murder of JFK.

Liberty Lobby appeal trial
Lane represented the political advocacy group Liberty Lobby as an attorney when the group was sued over an article in The Spotlight newspaper implicating E. Howard Hunt (a convicted Watergate burglar) in the Kennedy assassination. Hunt sued for defamation and was awarded $650,000 in damages. Lane successfully had this judgment reversed on appeal.

This case became the basis for Lane's book Plausible Denial. In the book, Lane claimed that he convinced the jury that Hunt was involved in the JFK assassination, but mainstream news accounts asserted that some jurors decided the case on the issue of whether The Spotlight had acted with actual malice. Lane represented Willis Carto after Carto lost control of the Institute for Historical Review in 1993.

Random House suit
In 1995, Lane lost a defamation suit against book publisher Random House, which used the caption "Guilty of Misleading the American Public" under a photo of Lane in an advertisement for Gerald Posner's Case Closed. He sought $10 million in damages for disparagement of his integrity and the unauthorized use of his photograph. Lane was rebuked by Judge Royce C. Lamberth of the United States District Court for the District of Columbia, who said: "A conspiracy theory warrior outfitted with Lane's acerbic tongue and pen should not expect immunity from an occasional, constrained chastisement." A similar suit filed by Robert J. Groden against Random House was dismissed the previous year by a federal judge in New York.

Vietnam War crimes investigations

In 1970, Lane involved himself in several war crime inquiries being conducted primarily by antiwar organizations such as the  National Committee for a Citizens Commission of Inquiry on U.S. War Crimes in Vietnam Citizens Commission of Inquiry and the Vietnam Veterans Against the War. Lane used his contacts and raised funds to support these events, including what would become the  National Committee for a Citizens Commission of Inquiry on U.S. War Crimes in Vietnam National Veterans Inquiry and the VVAWs Winter Soldier Investigation.  National Committee for a Citizens Commission of Inquiry on U.S. War Crimes in Vietnam and VVAW had originally combined their efforts toward the production of one large war crime investigation, and Lane was initially invited to join the organizing steering committee. Lane suggested the Winter Soldier name, based on Thomas Paine's description of the "summer soldiers" at Valley Forge shrinking from service to their country in a time of crisis.  Lane would often travel with fellow activist Jane Fonda to antiwar speaking engagements and fundraising rallies. Lane was also writing a book, Conversations with Americans, a collection of interviews with US servicemen about war crimes in the Vietnam War.

Lane's close association with the  National Committee for a Citizens Commission of Inquiry on U.S. War Crimes in Vietnam and VVAW would be short lived.  Tod Ensign recalled

It was a mistake to think that celebrities like Jane Fonda and Mark Lane who were used to operating as free agents would submit to the discipline of a steering committee. We should have placed them, instead, on an advisory panel where their visibility and political and money contacts would have been used without having to tangle with them on broader strategic and tactical questions.

National Committee for a Citizens Commission of Inquiry on U.S. War Crimes in Vietnam staffers criticized Lane as being arrogant and sensationalistic, and said the book he was writing had "shoddy reporting in it".  National Committee for a Citizens Commission of Inquiry on U.S. War Crimes in Vietnam leaders refused to work with Lane further and gave the VVAW leaders a "Lane or us" ultimatum. VVAW did not wish to lose the monetary support of Lane and Fonda, so the  National Committee for a Citizens Commission of Inquiry on U.S. War Crimes in Vietnam split from the project. The following month, after caustic reviews of Lane's book by authors and a Vietnam expert, VVAW also distanced itself from Lane.

James Reston Jr., in the Saturday Review, calls Lane's book disreputable, in that all of the reports contained in it are admittedly unverified, and lean toward the salacious. "Lane makes no pretense of distinguishing between fact and a soldier's talent for embellishment", Reston observed. Commenting on the book's redeeming social value, Reston added that "it would be to show that a pattern of atrocities exists in Vietnam, proving that while My Lai was larger, it was not unique. This needs to be demonstrated, since the Pentagon continues to insist that My Lai was an isolated case.  But the effort will have to be left to more responsible parties, like the National Veterans Inquiry." A review of Lane's book by Neil Sheehan in the New York Times Book Review claimed that four of the 32 servicemen interviewed by Lane for the book had misrepresented their military service, according to the Defense Department. Lane responded to Sheehan's inquiries by stating that the Defense Department is the least reliable of all sources for verification of atrocity accounts and that verification of simple facts about the interviewees was "not relevant." Sheehan called Lane's book irresponsible, concluding that, "Some of the horror tales in this book are undoubtedly true", and the "men who now run the military establishment cannot conduct a credible investigation... But until the country does summon up the courage to convene a responsible inquiry, we probably deserve the Mark Lanes." Because of Sheehan's review, Simon and Schuster reneged on the contract for the book. When Lane disproved Sheehan's charges, they were forced to settle with him.

The controversial book reviews caused concern in the VVAW leadership, as Andrew E. Hunt notes,

Sheehan's exposé had placed VVAW leaders in a difficult position. Lane's involvement with the planning of the Winter Soldier Investigation had been extensive. His legal and financial assistance had proven invaluable. Few VVAWers doubted his sincerity or devotion to the effort. Yet they feared associating with Lane could tarnish months of difficult work. "Then the question became, 'How do we protect our integrity?'" recalled Joe Urgo, "'How do we separate ourselves from this guy?'" Organizers hoped Lane would maintain a low profile. Their wishes were fulfilled.

VVAW veterans involved with the WSI event then realized they needed to take control, and insisted that there be no more interference from the likes of Lane. A new, all-veteran steering committee was formed without Lane. Ultimately, the WSI was an event produced by veterans only, without the need of civilians such as Lane and Fonda.

Assassination of Martin Luther King Jr.
Lane wrote Murder In Memphis with Dick Gregory (previously titled Code Name Zorro, after the CIA's code name for King) about the assassination of Martin Luther King Jr., in which he alleged a conspiracy and government coverup. Lane represented James Earl Ray, King's alleged assassin, before the House Select Committee on Assassinations (HSCA) inquiry in 1978. The HSCA said of Lane in its report, "Many of the allegations of conspiracy that the committee investigated were first raised by Mark Lane". He wrote an audio docudrama, Trial of James Earl Ray, that was broadcast on KPFK on April 3, 1978, casting doubt on Ray's guilt  Lane was Ray's lawyer for a time. He alleged that Ray was an innocent pawn in a government plot.

Peoples Temple

Engagement and work for the Peoples Temple
In 1978, Lane began to represent the Peoples Temple. Temple leader Jim Jones hired Lane and Donald Freed to help make the case of what it alleged to be a "grand conspiracy" by intelligence agencies against the Peoples Temple. Jones told Lane he wanted to "pull an Eldridge Cleaver", referring to the fugitive Black Panther who was able to return to the United States after repairing his reputation.

In September 1978, Lane visited Jonestown, spoke to Jonestown residents, provided support for the theory that intelligence agencies conspired against Jonestown and drew parallels between Martin Luther King Jr. and Jim Jones. Lane then held press conferences stating that "none of the charges" against the Temple "are accurate or true" and that there was a "massive conspiracy" against the Temple by "intelligence organizations," naming the CIA, FBI, FCC and the U.S. Post Office.  Though Lane represented himself as disinterested, the Temple paid Lane $6,000 per month to help generate such theories.  Regarding the effect of the work of Lane and Freed upon Temple members, Temple member Annie Moore wrote that "Mom and Dad have probably shown you the latest about the conspiracy information that Mark Lane, the famous attorney in the ML King case and Don Freed the other famous author in the Kennedy case have come up with regarding activities planned against us—Peoples Temple." Another Temple member, Carolyn Layton, wrote that Don Freed told them that "anything this drug out could be nothing less than conspiracy".

Jonestown tragedy
Lane was present in Jonestown during the evening of November 18, 1978, and witnessed or heard part of the events claiming at least 408 lives (out of a total recount of 915 carried out five days later); these events involved, up to some extent, murder suicide by cyanide poisoning and were compounded by the murder of Congressman Leo Ryan and four others at a nearby airstrip. For months before that tragedy, Jones frequently created fear among members by stating that the CIA and other intelligence agencies were conspiring with "capitalist pigs" to destroy Jonestown and harm its members.  This included mentions of CIA involvement in the address Jones gave the day before the arrival of Congressman Ryan.

During the visit of Congressman Ryan, Lane helped represent the Temple along with its other attorney, Charles R. Garry, who was furious with Lane for holding numerous press conferences and alleging the existence of conspiracies against the Peoples Temple. Garry was also displeased with Lane for making a veiled threat that the Temple might move to the Soviet Union in a letter to Congressman Ryan.

Late in the afternoon of November 18, two men wielding rifles approached Lane and Garry, who had earlier been sent to a small wooden house by Jones. It is not clear whether the gunmen were sent to kill Lane and Garry, but one of the gunmen recognized Garry as an attorney in a trial that the gunman had attended. After a relatively friendly exchange, the men informed Garry and Lane that they were going to "commit revolutionary suicide" to "expose this racist and fascist society". The gunmen then gave Garry and Lane directions to exit Jonestown. Garry and Lane then sneaked into the jungle, where they hid and called a temporary truce while the tragedy unfolded.

On a tape made while members committed suicide by ingesting cyanide-poisoned punch, the reason given by Jones to commit suicide was consistent with Jones's previously stated conspiracy theories of intelligence organizations allegedly conspiring against the Temple, that men would "parachute in here on us", "shoot some of our innocent babies" and "they'll torture our children, they'll torture some of our people here, they'll torture our seniors". Parroting Jones's prior statements that hostile forces would convert captured children to fascism, one temple member states, "[T]he ones that they take captured, they're gonna just let them grow up and be dummies".

After the tragedy
Lane later wrote a book about the tragedy, The Strongest Poison. Lane reported hearing automatic weapon fire and presumes that U.S. forces killed Jonestown survivors. While Lane blames Jones and Peoples Temple leadership for the deaths at Jonestown, he also claims that U.S. officials exacerbated the possibility of violence by employing agents provocateurs. For example, Lane claimed that Temple attorney (and later defector) Timothy Stoen, who, Lane alleged, had repeatedly prompted the Temple to take radical action before defecting, "had evidently led three lives", one of those being a government informant or agent.

Later career and death
Lane is the author of the 1970 book Arcadia in which he details the effort to prove that James Joseph Richardson, a black migrant worker in Florida, had been falsely accused of killing his seven children. He was convicted of the murders through corrupt means used by the authorities involved. Richardson had been on death row for almost five years for the crimes, escaping execution by virtue of the Furman v. Georgia Supreme Court decision. Nineteen years after the book was published he received a hearing in which the charges were dropped thanks to the interventions of Lane and Miami's then- prosecutor, Janet Reno.  Richardson was released from prison after 21 years, and Richardson's babysitter, though suffering from dementia, later confessed to the murders.

Lane resided in Charlottesville, Virginia. He continued to practice law and lectured on many subjects, especially the importance of the United States Constitution (mainly the Bill Of Rights and the First Amendment) and civil rights.

At the annual Law Library of Congress and American Bar Association Law Day symposium 2001, on the question, "Who are the paradigms for the lawyer as reformer in American culture?", Mark Lane was one of the twelve legal figures featured by panel moderator, Bernard Hibbitts, professor at the University of Pittsburgh School of Law.

On May 10, 2016, Lane died of a heart attack at his home in Charlottesville at the age of 89.

Works
 Arcadia. Holt, Rinehart and Winston, 1970, .
 Chicago Eyewitness. Astor-Honor, 1968.
 Citizen Lane: Defending our Rights in the Courts, the Capitol, and the Streets, Laurence Hill Books, 2012, .
 A Citizen's Dissent: Mark Lane Replies to the Defenders of the Warren Report. Holt, Rinehart and Winston, 1968.
 Code Name Zorro. Pocket, 1978,  (with Dick Gregory), Reissued as: Murder in Memphis: The FBI and the Assassination of Martin Luther King. Thunder's Mouth Press, 1993, .
 Conversations with Americans: Testimony from 32 Vietnam Veterans. Simon & Schuster, 1970, .
 Last Word: My Indictment of the CIA in the Murder of JFK. Skyhorse Publishing, 2011, .
 Plausible Denial: Was the CIA Involved in the Assassination of JFK? Thunder's Mouth Press, 1991, .
 Rush to Judgment. Holt, Rinehart and Winston, 1966; 2nd edition issued Thunder's Mouth Press, 1992, .
 
 The Strongest Poison, Hawthorne Books, 1980, .

Sources
 Bugliosi, Vincent. Reclaiming History: The Assassination of President John F. Kennedy.  2007, Norton, .

Documentary
 Citizen Lane. US, 2013 (102 min) – directed by Pauley Perrette

References

External links
 The Lane Law Firm
 

1927 births
2016 deaths
1968 United States vice-presidential candidates
Activists from New York City
American conspiracy theorists
Brooklyn College alumni
Brooklyn Law School alumni
John F. Kennedy conspiracy theorists
Long Island University alumni
Democratic Party members of the New York State Assembly
Military personnel from New York City
New York (state) lawyers
People from Brooklyn
Peoples Temple
Researchers of the assassination of John F. Kennedy
Virginia lawyers
Writers from the Bronx
Writers from Charlottesville, Virginia
United States Army soldiers